Noot Seear (born Renata Seear; October 5, 1983) is a Canadian fashion model and actress.

Life and career
Seear was born in Vancouver, British Columbia. She was discovered in a shopping mall by a scout from the Look agency in Vancouver when she was 14 years old. She then began modelling in her home town in 1996. In 1997, she moved to New York City in order to further her career and gain more exposure. Seear's catwalk debut came in September 1998 at New York Fashion Week, where she walked for Calvin Klein, Daryl K and Ralph Lauren.

She has appeared in advertising campaigns for brands such as Chanel, Giorgio Armani, Kenzo,  Alor, Pantene Pro-V, Ralph Lauren Polo Jeans, Kenneth Cole, Neiman Marcus, Alberta Ferretti, Rolex and Yves Saint Laurent, where she was memorably styled as the Mona Lisa by Leonardo da Vinci for the Rive Gauche ad campaign in 1998. Notably, she has been the face of two fragrances: Calvin Klein ck one and Vera Wang by Vera Wang.

Seear has appeared on the cover of  Elle Germany, Amica (Italy), D (Italy) and Vogue Nippon and has been photographed by Patrick Demarchelier, Mario Sorrenti and Paolo Roversi.

During her career, she has walked the runway for designers such as Balenciaga, Lanvin, Karl Lagerfeld, Alexander Wang, Proenza Schouler, Ralph Lauren, Diane von Furstenberg, Givenchy, Chanel and Alexander McQueen.

Seear has also pursued a career as an actress, and played the role of Heidi in the sequel to the movie Twilight, New Moon. Seear also made a guest appearance in season 2 of House of Lies in the episode "Damonschildren.org".

Filmography

References

External links 

 Noot Seear on style.com

Living people
1983 births
21st-century Canadian actresses
Actresses from Vancouver
Female models from British Columbia
Canadian child models
Canadian film actresses
Canadian television actresses